Church of San Pedro de Plecín is a former Roman Catholic church located in Alles (parish of San Pedro), capital of the council of Peñamellera Alta in Asturias, Spain.

Description
This late Romanesque former parish church of San Pedro de Plecín, located about 500 meters from the center of Alles, is now in ruins, and was originally dedicated to San Salvador.

It probably stands on an ancient pre-Christian place of worship and was built in the last quarter of the 12th century as a Romanesque chapel, or cella, of rectangular shape. The temple's west side was expanded in the 13th century and renovated and equipped with a porch in the 15th century. In the 16th century, a funeral chapel was attached on the northern side. In 1787, a new parish church was erected in the center of Alles, and this church was abandoned. The temple has a single nave and currently a straight apse, which was preceded by a semicircular apse. The main entrance is on the southern side. The apse is made out of blocks of sandstone, which are also used in the roof on the southern end. The nave is limestone masonry. The roof is topped by a barrel vault and the nave has a wooden ceiling.

The southern entrance rests on a plinth and is protected with a grooved tile. It consists of four slightly pointed archivolts, over which runs a honeycomb design similar to that on the posts which support the archivolts. The archivolts have various decorative elements, but the capitals are badly deteriorated. They are decorated with plant motifs, human figures and various fantastic creatures (mermaids, griffins and centaurs). Their base shafts no longer exist. On the right is a small window divided with an arrow, which is framed by a checkered dust cover and a molded and a five lobed archivolt arc.

The funeral chapel on the north side is of a square layout. It has no openings, and is roofed with a simple ribbed vault, which has helped protect the scalloped brackets upon which the roof rests.

Inside, the bases that supported the columns of the triumphal arch have been preserved. A possible capital of this arch is now in the City of Alles. It is decorated with plant motifs. The straight section preceding the apse runs under a covered arcade with three columns on each side, and the remaining two small bases. At present, vegetation and weeds invade the interior of the church and all its walls. Its ruins were recently cleaned and consolidated. The church of San Pedro/San Salvador de Plecín is a beautiful example of late Romanesque churches akin stylistically to other late Romanesque structures in Palencia and Burgos.

See also
Iglesia de San Pedro (Alles)

Pedro de Plecin
Romanesque architecture in Asturias